The women's 10,000 metres event at the 2003 European Athletics U23 Championships was held in Bydgoszcz, Poland, at Zawisza Stadion on 19 July.

Medalists

Results

Final
19 July

Participation
According to an unofficial count, 14 athletes from 12 countries participated in the event.

 (1)
 (1)
 (1)
 (1)
 (2)
 (1)
 (1)
 (1)
 (1)
 (1)
 (1)
 (2)

References

10000 metres
10,000 metres at the European Athletics U23 Championships